The 2015 NC State Wolfpack football team represented North Carolina State University in the 2015 NCAA Division I FBS football season. They played their home games at Carter–Finley Stadium in Raleigh, North Carolina. It was their third season under head coach Dave Doeren. They were a member of the Atlantic Division of the Atlantic Coast Conference. They finished the season 7–6, 3–5 in ACC play to finish in fourth place in the Atlantic Division. They were invited to the Belk Bowl, where they lost to Mississippi State.

Recruiting class

Schedule

Source:

Coaching staff

Roster

Source:

References

NC State
NC State Wolfpack football seasons
NC State Wolfpack football